Statilia maculata, common name Asian jumping mantis or "小蟷螂", ko-kamakiri (Japanese meaning "small mantis") or "좀사마귀", joem-sa-ma-gui (Korean meaning "small mantis"), is a species of mantis native to Asia that can be found in Romania, China and Japan and Korea and Sri Lanka.

Description
Males: 40–80 mm in length as adult
Females: 45–58 mm in length as adult

Subspecies
Statilia maculata maculata China, Japan (Honshu, Shikoku, Kyushu), Taiwan, India (Andhra Pradesh, Arunachal Pradesh, Assam, Bihar, Himachal Pradesh, Kerala, Madhya Pradesh, Maharashtra, Meghalaya, Orissa, Sikkim, Uttar Pradesh, West Bengal), Java, Borneo, Nepal, Myanmar, New Guinea, Sri Lanka, Thailand, Korea  
Statilia maculata continentalis India (Uttar Pradesh)

Gallery

See also
List of mantis genera and species

References

Mantidae
Mantodea of Asia
Insects of China
Insects of Japan
Insects of Korea
Insects described in 1784